Montargil is a parish (freguesia) in the municipality of Ponte de Sor in Portugal. The population in 2011 was 2,316, in an area of 296.94 km2.

References

Freguesias of Ponte de Sor